Robert Patrick Benedict (born September 21, 1970) is an American actor and writer. His 25 year career includes more than 70 television and movie credits.  He is best known for his work on the television series Supernatural,  Threshold, Felicity and the comedy film Waiting....  He is also the lead singer/songwriter of the Los Angeles based band Louden Swain.

Early life
Benedict was born in Columbia, Missouri. He graduated from Northwestern University with a Bachelor's degree in Performance Studies.

Career

Acting
In the critically acclaimed WB series Felicity he appeared as Felicity Porter's dorm mate, Richard Coad. In CBS's Threshold Benedict played physicist Lucas Pegg, member of a secret government team investigating the first contact with an extraterrestrial species. In seasons 4, 5, 10, 11, 14 and 15 of  Supernatural he plays a writer, Chuck Shurley, previously thought to be a prophet of the lord but later revealed to be God, who eventually becomes the series main antagonist.  On Alias Benedict was Sydney Bristow's short-term CIA partner, Brodien. Additional early television series credits include Birds of Prey and Come to Papa, with guest appearances on NCIS, CSI, Monk, Medium, Chicago Hope, NYPD Blue, Buffy the Vampire Slayer, Snoops, Burn Notice, and Beverly Hills, 90210.

Other television credits include recurring roles in Lucifer, Bosch, NCIS: New Orleans, Masters of Sex, Fox's Touch, Franklin & Bash, and the digital series Susanna with Anna Paquin.  He also appeared as the irreverent power agent Jeremy Berger in the Starz Original comedy series Head Case. Other recent guest star appearances are Documentary: Now!, NCIS: Los Angeles, Criminal Minds: Beyond Borders, Shameless, Psych, Law and Order: Los Angeles., and NCIS: Hawaii. In 2023, he appeared as a background bandmember in the episode Hang On to Your Life of The Winchesters, a spinoff of Supernatural.

His feature film credits include A Little Help, with Jenna Fischer, State of Play with Russell Crowe.  In 2005 he starred as Calvin in the cult comedy Waiting... with Ryan Reynolds, and later revised the role in the sequel Still Waiting... Other films include Kicking & Screaming, with Will Ferrell, Group Sex, Say Goodnight with Aaron Paul, Two Days, with Paul Rudd, The First $20 Million Is Always the Hardest, starring Rosario Dawson, and Not Another Teen Movie.  In 2018, he had a starring role in the horror film 30 Miles from Nowhere, with Carrie Preston. Benedict has also done some voice acting work, most notably voicing the character Vin, in the video games Jak II and Jak 3.

Writing and producing
He co-wrote and starred in the independent short film Lifetripper, which made its debut at the LA Short Film Festival. He also co-wrote and played Miles Davis-Davidson in the Unauthorized Hangover 2 Documentary, which was featured on the DVD of The Hangover Part II.

In 2013 he wrote, produced and starred in the 30 minute short film The Sidekick, which starred Jordan Peele, Lizzy Caplan, Ike Barinholtz, Ron Livingston and Jason Ritter.

In 2017, he wrote, produced and starred in the 10 episode series Kings of Con with friend and fellow actor Richard Speight Jr. The series first aired on Comic-ConHQ and currently can be found on CWseed. The comedy series is set behind the scenes at fan conventions, based loosely on their real life experiences at said conventions.

He started a podcast on 27 March 2020 along with friend and fellow actor Richard Speight Jr., called "...And my Guest is Richard Speight". It ran for 10 episodes, ending on 5 August 2020. In September 2020, the two started a new podcast called Kings of Con: The Podcast , after their short series by the same name. The two also star in a podcast called Supernatural: Then and Now, where they revisit Supernatural while "Talking with the people that made it possible". Kings of Con and Supernatural: Then and Now are still ongoing.

Music
Benedict is the frontman and guitar player in the Los Angeles band Louden Swain, which has released eight albums.

Personal life
Rob has three older siblings; his sister, Amy Benedict, is also an actress.  He has two children, a daughter named Audrey and a son named Calvin.

Filmography

Film

Television

Video Games

References

External links
 
 
 Louden Swain
 CBS Threshold – Rob Benedict webpage
 Interview Rob Benedict with www.mycoven.com Nov. 2011

1970 births
Male actors from Missouri
American male film actors
American male stage actors
American male television actors
American male voice actors
American male video game actors
Living people
Northwestern University School of Communication alumni
Actors from Columbia, Missouri
Rock Bridge High School alumni